Another Fine Mess is a 1930 short comedy film directed by James Parrott and starring Laurel and Hardy. It is based on the 1908 play Home from the Honeymoon by Arthur J. Jefferson, Stan Laurel's father, and is a remake of their earlier silent film (and debut as an "official" duo) Duck Soup.

Plot 
Oliver Hardy and Stan Laurel are vagrants being chased by the police. They hide in the basement of the mansion of Allan Quatermain-style adventurer Colonel Wilberforce Buckshot, where they become trapped. The colonel has just departed for an African safari and the mansion is to be rented until his return, but the staff sneak off for a holiday, leaving the house empty. The house is surrounded by several policeman who are looking for Stan and Ollie, who must deceive a rich couple seeking to rent the house. Ollie disguises himself as Buckshot and Stan disguises himself as both butler Hives and chambermaid Agnes.

The real Colonel Buckshot unexpectedly returns to fetch his bow and arrows, only to find the disorder that had ensued after his departure. Ollie continues his masquerade as Colonel Buckshot to the real colonel until he sees a portrait on the wall of the real owner. The colonel calls the police and Stan and Ollie escape dressed as a wildebeest on a stolen tandem bicycle. They ride into a railroad tunnel and encounter a tram but emerge riding unicycles because the tram has split the bicycle in half.

Cast 
 Stan Laurel as Stan
 Oliver Hardy as Ollie
Uncredited:

Production 
The film's technical credits are recited by two girls in usherette outfits at the beginning of the film. Beverly and Betty Mae Crane performed the "talking titles" for several Hal Roach productions during the 1930–31 season as an experimental alternative to standard title cards.

Another Fine Mess is the first Laurel and Hardy film to feature background music by Leroy Shield. Several previous Laurel and Hardy sound shorts experimented with music scores, but beginning with this film, music would be heard regularly in Laurel and Hardy, Our Gang and Charley Chase shorts and other Hal Roach productions such as The Boy Friends. Although some contemporaneous Laurel and Hardy films were also produced in foreign-language versions, with dialogue spoken phonetically, none are known to exist for Another Fine Mess.

Exteriors were filmed at the former Guasti Villa at 3500 West Adams Boulevard in Los Angeles. which still stands and is the home of the Peace Theological Seminary & College of Philosophy.

See also 
 List of American films of 1930

References

External links 
 
 
 
 

1930 films
1930 comedy films
Remakes of American films
American black-and-white films
Films directed by James Parrott
Laurel and Hardy (film series)
Metro-Goldwyn-Mayer short films
Sound film remakes of silent films
Films with screenplays by H. M. Walker
Films set in country houses
1930s American films